Ibrahim Hamis Juma (born 15 June 1958) is a Tanzanian lawyer and the current Chief Justice of Tanzania.

Biography
He was appointed a High Court judge by President Jakaya Kikwete in 2008 before he was promoted to serve in the Court of Appeal in 2012.
He also served as the chairman of Law Reform Commission of Tanzania (LRCT). He was appointed by President John Magufuli in 10 September 2017. Prior to his appointment as a Chief Justice, he served as Acting Chief Justice and as a justice in the Court of Appeal.

References

1958 births
Living people
Alumni of the University of London
Lund University alumni
Ghent University alumni
Chief justices of Tanzania
People from Musoma